Starokuktovo (İśke Küktaw) is a rural locality (a selo) and the administrative centre of Starokuktovsky Selsoviet, Ilishevsky District, Bashkortostan, Russia. The population was 669 as of 2010. There are 20 streets.

Geography 
Starokuktovo is located 6 km northwest of Verkhneyarkeyevo (the district's administrative centre) by road. Verkhneyarkeyevo is the nearest rural locality.

References 

Rural localities in Ilishevsky District